Quebec law is unique in Canada because Quebec is the only province in Canada to have a juridical legal system under which civil matters are regulated by French-heritage civil law. Public law, criminal law and federal law operate according to Canadian common law.

Quebec law is under the shared responsibility of the federal government and the provincial government. According to the Constitution of Canada, these two governments are each responsible for enacting law when it falls under their sphere of competence. As such, the federal government is responsible for criminal law, foreign affairs, commerce, interprovincial transportation, and telecommunications. The provincial government is responsible for private law, the administration of justice and several social domains, such as social assistance, healthcare, education, and natural resources.

The four classic sources of law, legislation, case law, doctrine and customary law, together make up Quebec law. Legislation is the primary source, but because private law is mostly exercised under a civil tradition, case law is also a strong source. The law is made up of the Constitution of Canada, the laws of the Quebec Legislature and the rules related to legislating.

English is not an official language in Quebec law. However, both English and French are required by the Constitution Act, 1867 for the enactment of laws and regulations, and any person may use English or French in the National Assembly and the courts. The books and records of the National Assembly must also be kept in both languages.

Historical development 
Quebec's legal system was established when New France was founded in 1663. In 1664, Louis XIV decreed in the charter creating the French East India Company that French colonial law would be primarily based on the Custom of Paris, the variant of civil law in force in the Paris region. Justice was administered according to the “Code Louis”, consisting of the 1667 ordinance on civil procedure and 1670 ordinance on criminal procedure. Trials were conducted under an inquisitorial system. The French law merchant was in force as regulated by the 1673 “Code Savary” on trade.

In 1763, at the conclusion of the Seven Years' War, France ceded sovereignty over Quebec to Britain, in the Treaty of Paris. The British Government then enacted the Royal Proclamation of 1763 which set out the principles for the British government of the colony. In particular, the Royal Proclamation provided that all courts in Quebec were to decide "... all Causes, as well Criminal as Civil, according to Law and Equity, and as near as may be agreeable to the Laws of England." This provision displaced the Paris customary law for all things civil and criminal. However, in 1774, the British Parliament passed the Quebec Act, which re-instated the civil law legal system for private law in general and property law in particular.

The key provision of the Quebec Act was s. VIII, which provided that all disputes relating to "Property and Civil Rights" were to be decided by the former law of Quebec. This phrase was carried forward as s. 92(13) of the British North America Act, 1867. This section granted all the provinces, including Quebec, the exclusive power to legislate with respect to private civil law matters. While the other provinces operate under common law, Quebec continues to apply civil law toward civil private law matters. In areas of law under federal jurisdiction, however, Quebec is, like its fellow Canadian provinces and territories, subject to common law. Quebec has therefore a bijuridical legal system.

Civil law and common law occasionally overlap or contradict each other. For instance, under section 91 (26) of the British North America Act, 1867, marriage and divorce fall under federal jurisdiction. However, marriage ceremonies are solemnized according to the Civil Code of Quebec, while divorce proceedings may apply federal laws and regulations and common law concepts such as in loco parentis, which has no equivalent at civil law according to which only the biological or legally adoptive relationship with offspring are recognized. Criminal law is, however, based on the common law system and applied at the federal level.

Public and private law 

Quebec law can be divided into 2 spheres: private law and public law. Private law concerns the relations between individuals, while public law deals with the rules that govern the Québécois government.

Private law in Quebec affects all relationships between individuals (natural or juridical persons) and is largely under the jurisdiction of the Parliament of Quebec. The Parliament of Canada also influences Quebec private law, in particular through its power over banks, bankruptcy, marriage, divorce and maritime law. The  is the primary component of Quebec's private law and is codified in the Civil Code of Quebec. The Civil Code of Quebec is the primary text delimiting Jus commune in Quebec and includes the principles and rules of law governing legal persons, property law, family law, obligations, conflict of laws, etc. For historical reasons, the Droit civil du Québec has been strongly influenced by the civil law of France.

Public law in Quebec is largely derived from the common law tradition. Quebec constitutional law is the area of law that governs the rules surrounding the Quebec government, the Parliament of Quebec and Quebec's various courts. Quebec constitutional law is governed in large part by the Constitution of Canada, in particular by the Constitution Act of 1867, but also by various acts of the Parliament of Quebec. Quebec administrative law is the area of law that governs relations between individuals and the Quebec public administration. Quebec also has some jurisdiction over criminal law, but in a limited fashion, since the Parliament of Canada is responsible for criminal law. Quebec criminal law nevertheless includes a wide range of offences (etc.). Finally, Quebec, like the federal government, has tax law power.

Certain portions of Quebec law are considered mixed. This is the case, for example, with human rights and freedoms which are governed by the Quebec Charter of Human Rights and Freedoms, a Charter which applies to both government and citizens.

The Civil Codes

Civil Code of Lower Canada 
In 1866, the Parliament of the Province of Canada enacted the Civil Code of Lower Canada. This Civil Code applied only in Lower Canada, which a year later became the Province of Quebec. The Code was comprehensive and covered all areas of private civil law. The Code was largely based on and inspired by the Napoleonic Code of 1804.

The Civil Code of Lower Canada consisted of four books:
 Persons;
 Property and its Different Modifications;
 Means of Acquiring and Owning Property;
 Commercial Law.

Civil Code of Quebec 
In 1980, the Province of Quebec enacted a new Civil Code of Quebec, dealing only with family law. This was an intermediary stage in the development of an entirely new civil code. The Legislature decided to enact this new Code because of the need for immediate reforms to the family law of Quebec.

Quebec's current civil code, the Civil Code of Quebec, was the product of a lengthy review of the civil law, beginning with the establishment of the Civil Code Revision Office in 1955. The new Civil Code of Quebec was enacted in 1991, and came into force in 1994. This Code repealed both the Civil Code of Lower Canada and the Civil Code of Quebec of 1980.

The current Code consists of ten books:
 Persons
 The Family
 Successions
 Property
 Obligations
 Prior Claims and Hypothecs
 Evidence
 Prescription
 Publication of Rights
 Private International Law

Civic values and social order 
Quebec is a free and democratic society that abides by the rule of law. The Government of Quebec cites five statements that represent the key values of Québécois society:
 Quebec is a francophone society
 Quebec is a democratic society
 Women and men are equal
 Québécois have rights and responsibilities
 Quebec is a laïque society

Québécois society bases its cohesion and specificity on a set of statements, a few notable examples of which include:
 The Quebec Charter of Human Rights and Freedoms
 The Charter of the French Language
 The Civil Code of Quebec

Courts 

Although Quebec is a civil law jurisdiction, it does not follow the pattern of other civil law systems which have court systems divided by subject matter. Instead, the court system follows the English model of unitary courts with general jurisdiction. The provincial courts have jurisdiction to decide matters under provincial law as well as federal law, including civil matters, criminal matters and constitutional matters. The major exception to the principle of general jurisdiction is that the Federal Court and Federal Court of Appeal have exclusive jurisdiction over some areas of federal law, such as review of federal administrative bodies, federal taxes, and matters relating to national security.

All courts, whether federal or provincial, are protected by the principle of judicial independence. The Supreme Court has held that judicial independence is a fundamental constitutional principle. The courts must have complete freedom to decide cases which come before them based on the law and the facts, without any political interference. The federal and provincial governments have legislative authority with respect to court structure and court administration, but the core function of deciding cases is reserved to the courts.

The Quebec courts are organized in a pyramid. At the bottom, there are the municipal courts, the Professions Tribunal, the Human Rights Tribunal, and administrative tribunals. Decisions of those bodies can be reviewed by the two trial courts, the Court of Quebec the Superior Court of Quebec. The Court of Quebec is also the main criminal trial court, and also a court for small civil claims. The Superior Court is a trial court of general jurisdiction, in both criminal and civil matters. The decisions of those courts can be appealed to the Quebec Court of Appeal. Finally, if the case is of great importance, it may be appealed to the Supreme Court of Canada, which is a court of general appeal, with jurisdiction over all legal issues which can arise in the lower courts.

The Parliament of Canada has legislative authority over the Supreme Court and other federal courts, subject to the principle of judicial independence. The federal government pays the judges of those courts and provides the necessary administrative supports, such as court employees and courthouses. The federal government also appoints the judges of the Quebec Court of Appeal and the Superior Court, pays their salaries, and has exclusive power to remove them from office. Although the judges of these courts are appointed and paid by the federal government, it is the government of Quebec which is responsible for laws regulating the court structure and the necessary administrative supports for the court system.

The three main courts are the Court of Appeal, the Superior Court and the Quebec Court. Of these, the Court of Appeal serves two purposes. First, it is the general court of appeal for all legal issues from the lower courts. It hears appeals from the trial decisions of the Superior Court and the Quebec Court. It also can hear appeals from decisions rendered by those two courts on appeals or judicial review matters relating to the municipal courts and administrative tribunals. Second, but much more rarely, the Court of Appeal possesses the power to respond to reference questions posed to it by the by the Quebec Cabinet. The Court of Appeal renders more than 1,500 judgments per year.

The Superior Court of Quebec has the inherent power to rule on all cases other than those where jurisdiction is assigned to another court or tribunal. This means that the Superior Court has the power to hear all civil claims under the Civil Code of Quebec, determine matters under family law, including under the federal Divorce Act, and hear class actions. It also has jurisdiction to hear appeals and judicial review applications from lower courts and administrative tribunals. The Superior Court is also a cour of criminal jurisdiction under the federal Criminal Code. It is the trial court for the most serious criminal offences, and also is the appellate court from criminal decisions of the Quebec Court.

The Court of Quebec is a court of statutory jurisdiction, rather than a court of general jurisdiction. However, its criminal law jurisdiction is very extensive, as all but the most serious criminal cases are heard by the Court of Quebec. In addition, the Court of Quebec is made up of three chambers: the Youth Division, the Criminal and Penal Division and the Civil Division. The Civil Division includes the small claims division. Until recently, the Court of Quebec had exclusive jurisdiction over all civil matters where the amount in issue was under $85,000, but the Supreme Court of Canada has held that it is unconstitutional to assign exclusive jurisdiction over those matters to the Court of Quebec and take that jurisdiction away from the Superior Court.

The municipal courts, the Human Rights Tribunal, and the Professions Tribunal are all trial courts. Their powers are limited to the powers that are given to them by the statute which created them.

Quebec has a large number of administrative tribunals responsible for seeing to the application of one or more laws. In total, the Quebec judicial system has more than 500 judges. Nearly 300 of them work in the provincial courts, 25 at the Court of Appeal and nearly 200 at the Superior Court.

Lawyers 
Unlike in the other Canadian provinces, Quebec possesses two distinct types of lawyers. In Quebec, lawyers are either advocates or notaries. Indeed, statute forbids a lawyer from having a dual practice, i.e. an advocate cannot practice both as an advocate and a notary at the same time.

Advocates must have a bachelor's degree in civil law, complete an articled clerkship, pass the professional bar course and be called to the Quebec bar before being able to practise. Currently, five universities in Quebec and one university in Ontario offer an undergraduate degree in civil law, under various names: McGill University grants a Bachelor of Civil Law degree, the University of Ottawa grants a Licence en droit (LL.L.) while the other universities, such as Université Laval, grant a Bachelor of Laws degree (LL.B.).

Notaries in Quebec, like those in other countries with legal systems based on civil law, are office lawyers who are restricted to non-contentious legal business such as real estate, law of inheritance, non-contentious family law, and company law. To practise as a notary, candidates must have, in addition to a law degree, a 1-year master's degree in notarial law and be a member of the Quebec notaries’ society (Chambre des notaires du Québec).

Law enforcement 

The Sûreté du Québec is the main police force of Quebec, and it is responsible for the application of the law on the entire Québécois territory. The Sûreté du Québec can also serve a support and coordination role with other police forces, such as with municipal police forces or with the Royal Canadian Mounted Police (RCMP).

Municipal police, such as the Service de police de la Ville de Montréal and the Service de police de la Ville de Québec, are responsible for law enforcement in their municipalities. The Sûreté du Québec fulfills the role of municipal police in the 1038 municipalities without a municipal police force. The indigenous communities of Quebec have their own police forces.

The RCMP has the power to enforce certain federal laws in Quebec. However, given the existence of the Sûreté du Québec, its role is more limited than in the other provinces.

The Department of Justice of Canada also has the power to prosecute offenders, but only for offences against specific federal laws (ex. selling narcotics). When it comes to the penal system, Quebec is responsible for operating the prison system for sentences of less than two years, while the federal government operates penitentiaries for sentences of two years or more.

See also
 Canadian Law
 Legal systems of the world

External links
 Civil Code of Quebec
 Annotated Civil Code of Quebec
 Quebec Act, 1774

References

Law